RAS protein activator like 3 is a protein that in humans is encoded by the RASAL3 gene.

References

Further reading